Petronella Moens (16 November 1762 – 4 January 1843) was a blind Dutch writer, editor, and feminist. She managed a paper in 1788–1797, in which she spoke for political issues such as slavery and women suffrage.

Biography

Petronella Moens was born on 16 November 1762 in Kûbaard, the Netherlands, the third child of Petrus Moens, a pastor, and Maria Lycklama à Nijeholt and grew up in Ossendrecht and Aardenburg. Moens's mother died in 1769 while giving birth to her sister Baukje. That same year, Moens contracted smallpox while staying in IJzendijke and was struck blind. Despite her disability, she would write dozens of poems and books, such as Songbook for the Churches and its 432 songs. In 1785, she received a gold medal from the Amsteldamsch Dicht- en Letterlievend Genootschap for her poem De  christian and would by the end of her life possess ten such awards.

See also
 List of women printers and publishers before 1800

Citations

External links
  Website of the Petronella Moens Foundation
  Digital Library for Dutch Literature: Biographies, works, and texts of Petronella Moens Foundation
  Digitized edition of the Album Amoricum

1762 births
1843 deaths
18th-century Dutch women writers
18th-century Dutch writers
Dutch feminists
Dutch journalists
Dutch women poets
Dutch blind people
Blind writers
People from Littenseradiel
18th-century Dutch businesspeople
18th-century journalists
18th-century publishers (people)
18th-century Dutch businesswomen
18th-century women journalists